ammoflight was a Japanese pop rock band formed in 2008, from Odawara, Kanagawa, Japan. The band is on hiatus.

The band is known for their 2012 single, "Natsuiro Dot", which peaked at number 7 on the Billboard Japan Hot 100.

Members
 Koji Tsukui - lead vocals, guitar
 Yosuke Kubota - lead guitar, backing vocals
 Naoto Toriizuka - bass
 Kazushige Kasai - drums, percussion

Discography

Albums

Studio albums

Extended plays

Singles

Promotional singles

References

External links
Official website

Musical groups from Kanagawa Prefecture
Musical groups established in 2008
Musical groups disestablished in 2015
2008 establishments in Japan
2015 disestablishments in Japan